FC Nikopol is a professional Ukrainian football club from the city of Nikopol, Dnipropetrovsk oblast and Makiivka, Donetsk Oblast before 2015. Another FC Nikopol has existed in Nikopol prior to relocation of FC Makiivvuhillya.

History

Makiyivvuhillya (Makeyevugol)

It should be mentioned that previously Makiivvuhillya was represented by a team of the Bazhanov coal mine known as FC Shakhtar Makiivka.

The current club was formed in Makiivka in 2009 and became professional in 2011 entering the Professional Football League of Ukraine and was based in Makiivka under the name FC Makiyivvuhillya Makiyivka. The name of the club is associated Makiyivka's coal industry, since the city of Makiyivka is close proximity to the city of Donetsk. The football team was created out of the state mining enterprise Makiyivvuhillya in the summer of 2009 to participate in the Coal Industry Cup. In the finals of the Coal Industry Cup, a tournament which Makiyivka defeated SE "Dzerzhynskvuhillya."

After the event the company decided to continue supporting the football team,
with general director Stanislav Tolchin becoming the honorary president of football club.
The President of the club became Anatoly Akimochkin and head coach was Spartak Zhyhulin.

In the winter of 2009, Makiyivvuhillya won the city championship in Makiyivka and finished 3rd in the Donetsk oblast championship.
In 2010 the team became a finalist of the Coal Industry Cup (losing to FC Shakhtar Sverdlovsk) and 3rd place again in the Donetsk oblast championship. In 2011, the team participated in the Ukrainian Amateur championship.

In the Second League the club played its home games at the Bazhanovets Stadium, which was also used by the former Soviet/Ukrainian club Shakhtar Makiyivka (also known as Bazhanovets) but the stadium was found lacking in facilities. Later the club played at Metalurh Stadium in Yenakiieve.

Nikopol-NPHU
 

In 2014, the club was forced to relocate to Nikopol, Dnipropetrovsk Oblast, due to the 2014 Russian aggression against Ukraine. It also lost its main sponsor Makiyivvuhillya, but in Nikopol the club was taken under its wing the Independent Trade Union of Miners of Ukraine (NPHU) which added own abbreviation to the club's name as Makeyevugol-NPHU. After the 2014–15 season the club formally withdrew from the PFL and reentered under the name of FC Nikopol-NPHU.

The club plays at the stadium of FC Elektrometalurh-NZF Nikopol, while trains at the stadium of FC Kolos Chkalove from Chkalove.

FC Nikopol

During the winter break of the 2016–17 Ukrainian Second League season, the club renamed themselves to FC Nikopol.

Other clubs in Nikopol

In Nikopol is another FC Nikopol that participated in the 2007 Ukrainian Amateur Cup and place third in football championships of Dnipropetrovsk Oblast in 2009 and 2013. Both FC Nikopol and FC Kolos Chkalove were withdrawn from the Dnipropetrovsk Oblast championship in 2015.

Stadiums

Players

League and cup history

{|class="wikitable"
|-bgcolor="#efefef"
! Season
! Div.
! Pos.
! Pl.
! W
! D
! L
! GS
! GA
! P
!Domestic Cup
!colspan=2|Europe
!Notes
|-
|colspan=14 align=center|Known as FC Makiyivvuhillya Makiivka
|-bgcolor=SteelBlue
|align=center|2011
|align=center|4th
|align=center|4
|align=center|8
|align=center|2
|align=center|2
|align=center|4
|align=center|6
|align=center|11
|align=center|8
|align=center|
|align=center|
|align=center|
|align=center|
|-bgcolor=PowderBlue
|align=center|2011–12
|align=center|3rd "B"
|align=center|14
|align=center|26
|align=center|5
|align=center|2
|align=center|19
|align=center|17
|align=center|8
|align=center|17
|align=center|  finals
|align=center|
|align=center|
|align=center|
|-bgcolor=PowderBlue
|align=center rowspan="2"|2012–13
|align=center|3rd "B"
|align=center|12
|align=center|24 	
|align=center|5 	 	
|align=center|2 		 	 	
|align=center|17 	 		
|align=center|21 	 		 	
|align=center|58 	 	 	
|align=center|17
|align=center rowspan=2|  finals
|align=center|
|align=center|
|align=center|
|-bgcolor=PowderBlue
|align=center|3rd "4"
|align=center|4
|align=center|32
|align=center|8
|align=center|3 	 	
|align=center|21 			
|align=center|32
|align=center|71	 	 	
|align=center|27
|align=center|
|align=center|
|align=center|Relegation group
|-bgcolor=PowderBlue
|align=center|2013–14
|align=center|3rd
|align=center|13
|align=center|36
|align=center|13
|align=center|6
|align=center|17
|align=center|33
|align=center|47
|align=center|45
|align=center|  finals
|align=center|
|align=center|
|align=center|
|-bgcolor=PowderBlue
|align=center|2014–15
|align=center|3rd
|align=center|8
|align=center|27 	
|align=center|5 	
|align=center|6 	
|align=center|16 	
|align=center|23 	
|align=center|45
|align=center|21
|align=center|
|align=center|
|align=center|
|align=center|moved to Nikopol
|-
|colspan=14 align=center|reorganized as FC Nikopol-NPHU
|-bgcolor=PowderBlue
|align=center|2015–16
|align=center|3rd
|align=center|14
|align=center|26 	
|align=center|2 	
|align=center|6 	
|align=center|18 	
|align=center|18 	 	
|align=center|51 		
|align=center|12
|align=center|  finals
|align=center|
|align=center|
|align=center|
|-
|colspan=14 align=center|renamed as FC Nikopol
|-bgcolor=PowderBlue
|align=center|2016–17
|align=center|3rd
|align=center|11
|align=center| 	32 	
|align=center| 12 	
|align=center|	5 	
|align=center|15 	 	
|align=center|40 	 	
|align=center|49 		
|align=center|41 	
|align=center|  finals
|align=center|
|align=center|
|align=center|
|-bgcolor=PowderBlue
|align=center|2017–18
| align="center" |3rd "B"
|align=center|7
|align=center|33
|align=center|11
|align=center|12
|align=center|10
|align=center|36
|align=center|34
|align=center|45
|align=center|  finals
|align=center|
|align=center|
|align=center|
|-bgcolor=PowderBlue
|align=center|2018–19
| align="center" |3rd "B"
|align=center|10
|align=center|27
|align=center|3
|align=center|4
|align=center|20
|align=center|15
|align=center|54
|align=center|13
|align=center|  finals
|align=center|
|align=center|
|align=center|
|-bgcolor=PowderBlue
| align="center" |2019–20
| align="center" |3rd "B"
| align="center" |
| align="center" |
| align="center" |
| align="center" |
| align="center" |
| align="center" |
| align="center" |
| align="center" |
|align=center|  finals
| align="center" |
| align="center" |
| align="center" |
|}

Coaches
Makiivvuhillya
 2009-2009 Ihor Yefremenko
 2009-2015 Spartak Zhyhulin
Nikopol-NHPU
 2015-2016 Serhiy Zhytskyi
 2016-2016 Serhiy Valyayev
 2016-2017 Hryhoriy Varzhelenko
Nikopol
 2017-2020 Hryhoriy Varzhelenko
 2017-2020 Evgeny Yarovenko

See also
 FC Elektrometalurh Nikopol
 FC Shakhtar Makiivka

External links
 Official website  (FC Nikopol)
 Official website (Independent Trade Union of Miners of Ukraine)
 Official website (Makiivka Coal Mining)

References

 
Ukrainian Second League clubs
2009 establishments in Ukraine
Football clubs in Nikopol, Ukraine
Association football clubs established in 2009